TOPS Knives, Inc. is a tactical knife manufacturer located in Eastern Idaho, United States.  The company was established in December, 1988 and is owned by Michael J. Fuller and operated by President Leo Espinoza. The company primarily produces fixed-blade knives for military and law enforcement.

History
TOPS Knives was created in December 1998. Several old friends from the Vietnam War era developed a concept based on their experience and disappointment with the knives they were issued during the war, and they sought to correct these issues of strength and durability. TOPS has manufactured their knives in the United States, specifically in Idaho since they were founded. TOPS Knives was founded by veterans and supports the Wounded Warrior Project and other charitable organizations.

TOPS Knives has over 200 knife models in production with many more that have are no longer made. One of the most well-known models is the Tom Brown Tracker Knife. It was designed by Tom Brown Jr. and was featured in the 2003 Hollywood movie The Hunted.

References

External links

Knife manufacturing companies
Companies based in Idaho
Companies established in 1988
1988 establishments in Idaho